Sipsey is a town in Walker County, Alabama, United States. At the 2010 census the population was 437, down from 552.

Geography
Sipsey is located at  (33.823108, -87.086127).

History
Sipsey was founded in the early 1912-13 as a company town for the DeBardeleben Coal Company, founded by coal magnates Henry T. DeBardeleben, Milton Fies, and Nicholas M. Norris.
It was incorporated as a town on August 14, 1965.

Demographics

As of the census of 2000, there were 552 people, 212 households, and 149 families residing in the town. The racial makeup of the town was 68.12% White, 31.34% Black or African American, 0.18% Native American, 0.18% from other races, and 0.18% from two or more races. 0.18% of the population were Hispanic or Latino of any race.

There were 212 households, out of which 33.0% had children under the age of 18 living with them, 50.5% were married couples living together, 16.0% had a female householder with no husband present, and 29.7% were non-families. 27.8% of all households were made up of individuals, and 11.8% had someone living alone who was 65 years of age or older. The average household size was 2.60 and the average family size was 3.19.

In the town, the population was spread out, with 27.2% under the age of 18, 7.8% from 18 to 24, 27.4% from 25 to 44, 24.3% from 45 to 64, and 13.4% who were 65 years of age or older. The median age was 36 years. For every 100 females, there were 94.4 males. For every 100 females age 18 and over, there were 83.6 males.

The median income for a household in the town was $23,000, and the median income for a family was $26,500. Males had a median income of $25,625 versus $20,750 for females. The per capita income for the town was $8,644. About 23.3% of families and 24.8% of the population were below the poverty line, including 26.0% of those under age 18 and 31.3% of those age 65 or over.  The town elected its first black female Mayor in 2012. Mayor Belinda McCain is striving for economic development and green development for Sipsey.  Sipsey is served by a full-time police department under the supervision of Chief John B. Jackson, Jr., and a volunteer fire and rescue department under the supervision of Chief Rodney Morgan.

References

Towns in Walker County, Alabama
Towns in Alabama
Birmingham metropolitan area, Alabama